"The Black Stranger" is a fantasy short story by American writer Robert E. Howard, one of his works featuring the sword & sorcery hero Conan the Cimmerian. It was written in the 1930s, but not published in his lifetime. When the original Conan version of his story failed to find a publisher, Howard rewrote "The Black Stranger" into a piratical Terence Vulmea story entitled "Swords of the Red Brotherhood".

The original version of the story was later rewritten by L. Sprague de Camp into a different Conan story and published in Fantasy Magazine in February 1953 (dated March 1953 on the spine). It was retitled "The Treasure of Tranicos" for book publication later the same year. Its first hardbound publication was in King Conan by Gnome Press, and its first paperback publication was in Conan the Usurper published by Lancer Books in 1967. It was republished together with an introduction and two non-fiction pieces on the story and on Howard by de Camp with illustrations by Esteban Maroto as The Treasure of Tranicos by Ace Books in 1980.  

Howard's original version of the story was first published in 1987 in Echoes of Valor and more recently in the collections The Conan Chronicles Volume 2: The Hour of the Dragon (Gollancz, 2001) and Conan of Cimmeria: Volume Three (1935-1936) (Del Rey Books, 2005).

Plot summary
The story begins with Conan in the Pictish Wilderness in the aftermath of a treacherous act by King Numedides, fleeing native warriors who are now hunting him. To escape his pursuers, Conan ascends a nearby crag of rock. Suddenly, he sees the Picts inexplicably abandon their chase and turn back. Soon, Conan realizes this spot must be considered a forbidden place to the Picts. The hill turns out to hold a treasure cave along with the preserved bodies of a pirate captain, Tranicos, and his men. Conan's attempt to remove the treasure proves futile, as a demon of mist appears and attempts to strangle him. He barely escapes with his life, leaving the treasure undisturbed.

Coinciding with Conan's attempt at looting the treasure is the main plot of a character named Count Valenso Korzetta, a former nobleman from Zingara. Vanlenso has fled his homeland to escape an evil sorcerer whom he double-crossed - Thoth-Amon of the Ring - only to end up on the western shores of the Pictish territory. With his entourage are his niece, the Lady Belesa, and her handmaiden, Tina, along with other soldiers and retainers. The Count is stunned when he learns that a buccaneer, Black Zarono, has also landed on the shores, followed by the pirate Strombanni. Both pirates believe Valenso has traveled to this deserted region in search of the legendary Treasure of Tranicos.

The buccaneers are both bitter enemies and bring their feud towards the Count's stronghold. During a meeting one night between the Count, Black Zarono, and Strombanni, Conan surprisingly emerges from behind some drapery, having made his way into the fortress by stealth. The men learn from Conan that he has discovered the Treasure of Tranicos and would be willing to share the loot with the others, if they help him retrieve it. They reluctantly make a thieves' pact and agree to join Conan, knowing full well that they will kill him once the treasure is in their possession. Conan, on the other hand, has something else in mind for his companions, chiefly trapping them in the treasure vault to have them be killed by the demon, taking the treasure with the crews of both ships, and sailing away.

Conan's scheme ultimately fails, and the sailors find themselves trapped by Picts surrounding the rocky crag. The pirates once again declare a truce to combat a common foe. Once the pirates escape the crag, they race to the Count's stronghold with the Picts in hot pursuit. The story ends with the defeat of the stronghold by the Picts and the treasure cave demon Toth-Amon called out to have his revenge on the Count, as well as the deaths of Strombanni and Black Zarono. However, Conan slays the demon with silver and fire and manages to escape across the fortress wall in the ensuing chaos, carrying both Belesa and Tina with him to safety.

Howard's version of the story pointed toward a new piratical career for Conan; one of de Camp's major changes was to make it instead lead into the revolution that would bring the Cimmerian to the throne of Aquilonia. The Counts of Poitain arrive on the isolated shores, looking for Conan to lead them against the despotic King of Aquilonia, Numedides. Tranicos' treasure would be used to finance the rebel army which would transform Conan from a pirate and mercenary into a king.

Picts as Native Americans

Though set in the Hyborian Age, a fictional past around 10,000 BC, the story has many connotations of the American Frontier, about which Howard also wrote some stories. The Picts are thinly-disguised Native Americans—with feathers in their hair, wearing moccasins, and wielding tomahawks. The situation of an isolated outpost behind its palisade, in the midst of a threatening forest, which is full of these hostile Picts is familiar from numerous historical and literary depictions of the frontier. Also, Conan makes several references to his being "a white man"—a racial bond uniting him, the "barbarian", with the other "civilized" protagonists, against their common foe: the Pictish "savages."

"Swords of the Red Brotherhood"

As noted above, when the original Conan version of his story failed to find a publisher, Howard re-wrote "The Black Stranger" as "Swords of the Red Brotherhood" by placing it in a historical background of 17th century America. In this version, the location is moved to the Pacific shore of Central America, and Conan becomes the Irish pirate Black Terence Vulmea. Howard regarded Conan's Cimmerians as the ancestors of the Irish people and other Celts. The exile Zingaran, Lady Belesa, becomes a French noblewoman named Francoise d'Chastillon, the rival Zingaran and Barachan pirates become respectively French and English, the Picts become Native Americans (which they already resembled in the original), and the Treasure of Tranicos becomes the Treasure of Montesuma. The main differences with the original are a reduction of the supernatural element and that in the ending of this version, Black Vulmea is not offered any throne and is quite content to remain a pirate captain.

In both the original and this adaptation, the Cimmerian/Irish pirate protagonist is highly chivalrous. He saves the damsel in distress at considerable risk to himself, giving her as a parting gift a fortune in gemstones; big enough to have a comfortable wealthy life in Zingara/France. He asks for no sexual favors in return.

Reception
James Van Hise, reviewing the original Howard version of the story, stated that the "writing is so good that it draws you into the situations of the supporting characters with surprising ease" and added that ""The Black Stranger"    achieves the powerful epic scope of the best of the Howard Conan epics".

Adaptation
The de Camp version of the story was adapted by Roy Thomas and John Buscema in Savage Sword of Conan #47-48.

References

Sources

External links

 Conan the Barbarian at AmratheLion.com
 Conan.com: The Official Website
 

1953 short stories
1987 short stories
Central America in fiction
Conan the Barbarian stories by Robert E. Howard
Conan the Barbarian stories by L. Sprague de Camp
Demons in written fiction
Fantasy short stories
Horror short stories
Native Americans in popular culture
Picts in fiction
Pirate books
Pulp stories
Short stories published posthumously
Books adapted into comics
Works originally published in Fantasy Fiction (magazine)
Works set in the 17th century